Scott Wheeldon (born ) is a former English professional rugby league footballer who played as a  for Hull F.C., Hull K.R., London Broncos, Castleford Tigers, Featherstone Rovers, and Sheffield Eagles .

Background
Wheeldon was born in Kingston upon Hull, East Riding of Yorkshire, England.

Career
He is a product of Hull FC's academy ranks.

Wheeldon made his Super League début in 2006. In the same year, he appeared for Hull F.C. in the 2006 Super League Grand final, playing from the interchange bench in his side's 4-26 defeat by St. Helens.

Wheeldon then went on to sign for local rivals Hull Kingston Rovers in 2008 and made his début in the Robins home game against Celtic Crusaders. 

Wheeldon transferred to London Broncos in 2012 and spent two seasons there before joining the Castleford Tigers (Heritage № 944) in 2014. 

He featured for the Tigers in the 2014 Challenge Cup Final defeat by the Leeds Rhinos at Wembley Stadium. In 2014 Wheeldon was voted the best player of table 21 at the Castleford Tigers end of year player awards.

In November 2015, it was announced that Wheeldon had signed for Sheffield Eagles on a 3-year deal. However, two seasons later he was released having played over 50 games and scoring 12 tries.

Following his release by the Eagles, Wheeldon joined their Championship rivals Featherstone Rovers in October 2017.

Having played 37 during the 2018 season for "Fev", Wheeldon re-joined the Eagles, where he ended his senior playing career in 2021.

References

External links

Featherstone Rovers profile
Sheffield Eagles profile
Cas Tigers profile

1986 births
Living people
Castleford Tigers players
English rugby league players
Featherstone Rovers players
Hull F.C. players
Hull Kingston Rovers players
London Broncos players
London Skolars players
Rugby league players from Kingston upon Hull
Rugby league props
Sheffield Eagles players